The Lakes, Parks and Leisure Administration in Bucharest has under its upkeep nine lakes and nine dams, from the total of 15 located on the Colentina River, that started to be built since 1936 and that cover a total area of  and have a combined volume of . The oldest manmade lake in Bucharest is the Herăstrău Lake, which was completed in 1936; this lake also has the oldest sluice in the city, built between 1933 and 1936, and  finalized in 2007.

List of lakes

Lake Fundeni is located in Sectorul 2

Lacul Lebedelor is a small lake located close to Lake Cișmigiu in Sectorul 1 and reserved for water birds.

Lacul Morii ("Mill Lake") is the largest lake in Bucharest.

Lake Plumbuita is located in Sectorul 2.

Lake Tineretului is located in Tineretului Park.

Lake Tei (Linden Tree Lake) is located in Tei Park, in the Tei neighborhood.

Lake Titan is in Titan Park.

Other lakes include Dobroești, the lake from Drumul Taberei Park, and the lake from Carol Park.

References

External links

Bucharest
Lakes
Lakes, Bucharest